Lamar Community College is a public community college in Lamar, Colorado.  Founded in 1937, it is the smallest member of the Colorado Community College System.

History 
The college was founded as the Junior College of Southeastern Colorado in 1937. The original building still stands at Eighth Street and Walnut. It became Lamar Junior College with the creation of a new district in 1946 and changed to Lamar Community College in 1965.  It became a member of the Colorado Community College System, formerly known as the State System of Community Colleges in 1968.

With a large campus, it is home to several instructional buildings, residence hall/cafeteria, Wellness Center, and Equine Complex.

In 2008, the college received a $2 million US Department of Higher Education Title III Strengthening Institutions grant to create three new programs in Science, Technology, Engineering, and Mathematics (STEM) to focus on Secondary Math and Science Education and Sports & Fitness Management; Construction Technology; and Renewable Energy Technology.

Campus 
The college occupies  on the southern edge of the City of Lamar on Highway 287.

Organization and administration 
The college is part of the Colorado Community College System. Despite its relative size, it serves a large primary service area of Prowers (Lamar is county seat), Baca, Cheyenne, and Kiowa Counties, in southeastern Colorado, United States and attracts students from across the US and internationally through its offerings and international student program.

Academic profile 
The college is particularly known for its Agriculture/Equine, Nursing, Business/IT, and Cosmetology programs. It offers a selection of transfer degrees and career and technical education degrees and certificates.

Student life

Sport 
The college athletic teams are nicknamed the Runnin’ Lopes. Lamar hosts five NJCAA Division I sports (men's baseball, men's and women's basketball, men's Golf, women's softball, and women's volleyball), co-ed National Intercollegiate Rodeo Association team, and a club men's soccer team.  Both LCC's men's baseball and basketball teams have risen to prominence in the region in the last decade.

Notable people 

Doug Brocail, pitching coach for the Houston Astros baseball team.
Brandon McCarthy, pitcher for Arizona Diamondbacks baseball team.
Andre President, American football player

References

External links 
 Official website

 
Colorado Community College System
Education in Prowers County, Colorado
Educational institutions established in 1937
NJCAA athletics
1937 establishments in Colorado